The history of Botafogo de Futebol e Regatas begins in 1891 when the Botafogo Regatta Group was founded in the city of Rio de Janeiro. Three years later, the group became Club de Regatas Botafogo and, in 1904, the Botafogo Football Club was created. After 38 years of the two associations existing in parallel, the merger between the two clubs created Botafogo de Futebol e Regatas, currently one of the most popular sports entities in Brazil.

Known for the five-pointed star on its emblem, which gives it the nickname "Estrela Solitária Club" ("Lonely Star Club"), Botafogo's official colors are black and white. Since 2007, it has held its football matches at the Nilton Santos Stadium, formerly known as Engenhão. Its main rivals are Flamengo, Fluminense, and Vasco da Gama.

It was nominated by FIFA to the select group of the greatest clubs of the 20th century. Among its main titles are twenty-one Carioca Championships, four Rio-São Paulo Tournaments, two Brazilian Championships, and a CONMEBOL Cup (precursor of the current Copa Sudamericana).

In addition, the club holds some of the top records in Brazilian football, such as the record for the most matches unbeaten: 52 matches between the years 1977 and 1978; the record for undefeated matches in Brazilian Championship matches: 42, also between 1977 and 1978; the largest number of player participation in total Brazilian National team matches (considering official and unofficial matches): 1100 participations; and the largest number of players assigned to the Brazilian National Team for World cups. The club is still responsible for the largest  victory ever recorded in Brazilian football: 24–0 over Sport Club Mangueira in the 1909 Carioca Championship.

Foundation

Predecessors 

Botafogo's history goes back to the 19th century, precisely 1891, when members of the Clube Guanabarense (from 1874), created the Grupo de Regatas Botafogo, having as one of its founders the rower Luiz Caldas, known as Almirante. Soon after Caldas' death, the group was regulated as Club de Regatas Botafogo. The club had as its headquarters a mansion, now demolished, in the south of Botafogo Beach, leaning against the Morro do Pasmado, where today the Pasteur Avenue ends.

On 12 August 1904, in parallel to the regatta club, a new football team, the Electro Club, was created on the initiative of Flávio Ramos and Emmanuel Sodré, two young men between 14 and 15 years old who studied together at Colégio Alfredo Gomes. A little over a month later, the name of the association was changed to Botafogo Football Club, at the suggestion of Flávio's maternal grandmother, known as Dona Chiquitota.

Botafogo de Futebol e Regatas 
Born from the union between Club de Regatas Botafogo and Botafogo Football Club, Botafogo de Futebol e Regatas was officially founded on 8 December 1942, the day of the Immaculate Conception, the club's patron saint. The merger between the two associations had been analyzed since 1931, but for many years it was resisted as people linked to the two clubs, such as historian Antônio Mendes de Oliveira Castro, of rowing, and João Saldanha, of football, guaranteed that Regatas was "infiltrated with Fluminense supporters", which is, among Botafogo's biggest rivals, the only one that never had a department linked to this sport.

In the 1940s, however, the union of the clubs was motivated by a tragedy: On 11 June 1942, the Regatas and Football clubs faced each other in a basketball match, for the Carioca Championship. Armando Albano, one of the main players of Botafogo Football Club and of the Brazilian National Team, left work late and arrived at the court with the game already in progress, at the end of the first half. During the break, Armando bent down to pick up a ball and collapsed on the court. He was promptly taken to the locker room and the game restarted. However, after a few minutes of trying to resuscitate him, the news of his death interrupted the match when the score was 23–21 for the football club. The decision to stop the game was made by Botafogo de Regatas, which abdicated the dispute so that Albano could have one last victory as tribute. Involved in a deep atmosphere of commotion, the leaders of the two associations opted for the merger of the clubs.

From this date on, the procedure for the merger began, made official around six months later. Botafogo de Futebol e Regatas was born, with a few changes: The flag remained with the horizontal stripes in black and white, but the emblem with the intertwined letters BFC was replaced by a black rectangle with the Lone Star in white. The top rowing symbol was changed to the shape of the football badge, now on a black background with a white outline.

Football

The 1900s and 1910s: The Glorious One ("O Glorioso") emerges 
In 1906, Botafogo won the first trophy in its history, the Caxambu Cup, the first football competition in Rio de Janeiro, disputed by secondary teams. In the same year, it also participated in the first edition of the Carioca Championship, finishing in 4th place. Its first victory in the competition was against Bangu, 1–0, with a goal by Gilbert Hime at the Estádio das Laranjeiras.

The following year, the club was involved in the first controversy in its history. At the end of the Carioca Championship, Botafogo was tied in points with Fluminense, but had less scored goals. While the rival declared itself the champion of that year, Botafogo contested the result because of its last game, against Internacional: The team from the north zone of the city did not show up for the match and the black-and-whites won by W.O., without having their goal difference counted. Feeling aggrieved at not having had the opportunity to score goals, the club asked for an extra match against Fluminense. The opponent did not accept the offer, since it declared itself champion based on the Metropolitan Football League's statute, which provided goal average as the tie-breaker. However, the statute had no value as a regulation and the championship decision dragged on for 89 years when finally, in 1996, both Botafogo and Fluminense were declared 1907 champions.

In the 1909 Carioca Championship, the team finished as runner-up but went down in history by inflicting the biggest score ever in Brazilian football: 24–0 over Mangueira, a team from Tijuca. In the first half of the match, Botafogo scored 9–0 and, in the second half, 15–0. Since in those days each half of the match was 40 minutes long, Botafogo averaged one goal every 3.3 minutes. Gilbert Hime was the top scorer of the match, with nine goals, followed by Flávio Ramos, with seven. Monk and Lulu Rocha had two goals each and Raul Rodrigues, Dinorah, Henrique Teixeira, and Emmanuel Sodré completed the scoring. The memorable result is highlighted in the "Numbers Room" at the football Museum in the Pacaembu Stadium.

In 1910, Botafogo won the Carioca Championship, scoring 66 goals in 10 games. After opening the season with a 4–1 loss to America, Botafogo recovered and scored several goals against their opponents throughout the competition: 9–1 and 15–1 against Riachuelo, 7–0 against Haddock Lobo, and 6–0 against Rio Cricket. In the quarter finals, against rival Fluminense, Botafogo secured the cup with a score of 6–1 and three goals by Abelardo de Lamare, the top scorer of the competition. In the last game, another rout: 11–0 over Haddock Lobo. This historic campaign gave the club the nickname it has carried ever since: O Glorioso ("The Glorious One"). Also that year, Botafogo became champion of the Interstate Trophy after defeating AA Palmeiras, the then São Paulo state champions, with another rout: 7–2, with three goals by Abelardo de Lamare, three by Décio Viccari, and one by Mimi Sodré. 

In 1911, the club disassociated itself from the Metropolitan Athleticos Sports League (LMSA), an entity founded by Botafogo, Fluminense, America, Paissandu, Rio Cricket, and Riachuelo in 1908 to organize the Carioca Championship after the dissolution of the Metropolitan Football League a year earlier. In a match against America, Gabriel de Carvalho, a player from America, fouled Flávio Ramos violently, who retaliated and caused a generalized fight. The brothers Adhemaro and Abelardo de Lamare were punished by the LMSA with six and twelve months suspensions, respectively, which angered the Botafogo managers, culminating in their dismissal from the league. Because of this, Botafogo spent some time playing only friendly matches against teams from São Paulo. At the end of the same year, the club also gave up their headquarters in Campo da Rua Voluntários da Pátria, to make money. In 1912, it played the Carioca Championship for the Football Association of Rio de Janeiro (AFRJ), in the field of Rua São Clemente, and became champion.

The 1910s and 1920s: the black-and-white hiatus 
The period between 1912 and 1930 was Botafogo's first period without titles. However, two Carioca Second Division Championships were won, in 1915 and 1922. The club was runner-up in the Carioca Championship four times, in 1913, 1914, 1916, and 1918, and had several top scorers in the tournament until 1920, such as Mimi Sodré, Luís Menezes, Aluízio Pinto, and Arlindo Pacheco. The club also won the Carioca Championship four times, in 1913, 1914, 1916, and 1918.

In the early 1910s, the club inaugurated the General Severiano Stadium and in the inaugural match, it defeated Flamengo 1–0, with a goal by Mimi Sodré. At this time, Botafogo also contributed to the creation of a very common term in Brazilian sports: The use of the expression cartola to refer to managers. In 1917, Dublin, one of Uruguay's best teams at the time, came to Rio de Janeiro for a season of friendly matches, including Botafogo. In the city, two Uruguayan directors appeared running ahead of their players to the middle of the field wearing tall, luxurious top hats ("cartola" in Portuguese), which originated the term. Another version states that it was the Botafogo officials who dressed up in tails and top hats to welcome the Uruguayans, to imitate the politicians of the Old Republic.

In the 1920s, Botafogo's best result was 3rd place in the 1928 Carioca Championship. In 1923, the team was almost relegated: After finishing the competition in 8th and last place, Botafogo had to play a knockout match against Villa Isabel, B Division champion, to define who would play in the first division the following year. With a 3–1 victory at Estádio das Laranjeiras, Botafogo remained in the A Division.

This period was also marked by a series of internal problems. In 1924, manager Oldemar Amaral Murtinho left the club, which led to the departure of striker Nilo, his nephew, and one of Botafogo's greatest idols, to rival Fluminense. The player only returned to Botafogo in 1927, two years after his uncle became the club's president. Nilo was the top scorer in that year's championship.

1930s: The four-time champion 

Early in the decade, led by strikers Nilo and Carvalho Leite, Botafogo won the 1930 Carioca Championship. In 1931, they placed 4th in the State Championship and won the Rio-São Paulo State Champions Cup after beating Corinthians with a score of 7–1 in the return match, with four goals by Nilo.

In 1932, it became champion with two rounds to spare, after defeating Bonsucesso Futebol Clube 5–4. Starting in 1933, two different leagues organized the Carioca Championship: The Metropolitan Football League Association (AMEA), responsible for the championship until then, and the Liga Carioca de Football (LCF), the result of a split promoted by the clubs that sought to professionalize football. Botafogo refused to change leagues and remained in the tournament organized by AMEA, being champions in 1933 and 1934. In 1935, AMEA disbanded and was incorporated by the newly created Metropolitan Sports Federation (FMD). In the first championship promoted by the new league, Botafogo once again took the title, becoming four-time champions and the first professional state champions recognized by the Brazilian Sports Confederation. In this last conquest, the team's highlight was Leônidas da Silva, an idol of rival Flamengo, who defended Botafogo from 1935 until early 1936, before transferring.

In 1936, the club made its first international tour, to play friendly matches in Mexico and the United States. In nine matches, the team won six, drew one, and lost two. The following year, renovations began on the General Severiano Stadium, to expand it and put up new cement bleachers. In the reinauguration match in 1938, they won 3–2 over Fluminense.

In this era, Botafogo lent players to the World cup. The edition with the largest number of players from the club called up was nine, in 1934, Italy: Goalkeepers Germano and Pedrosa, defender Octacílio, midfielders Ariel, Canalli, Martim Silveira and Waldyr, and the attacking duo Áttila and Carvalho Leite.

1940s: The fasting of Heleno de Freitas 
In the early 1940s, especially after the merger of rowing and football in 1942, Botafogo had great players on its team, but failed to win titles. Names such as Gérson dos Santos, Tovar, and Zezé Procópio passed through the club without lifting a trophy. Besides them, one of the greatest idols in Botafogo's history, controversial striker Heleno de Freitas, also left the club without winning trophies, except for the 1947 Início Cup and smaller competitions. In the team from 1940 to 1948, Heleno scored 209 goals in 235 games with the black-and-white jersey and formed alongside Tesourinha, Zizinho, Jair Rosa Pinto and Ademir Menezes the offensive quintet considered the greatest in the history of the Brazilian National team.

Despite that, it was only after Heleno's departure, in 1948, that Botafogo won the Carioca Championship again: After three consecutive runner-up finishes, the Glorioso debuted in that year's edition, defeated 4–0 by São Cristóvão. From then on, under coach Zezé Moreira and led on the field by Octávio Moraes and Sylvio Pirillo, the team never lost again in the competition. In the last match of the tournament, Botafogo defeated Vasco, the team nicknamed Expresso da Vitória ("Victory Express") by 3–1 and became champions.

The 1948 Carioca Championship was also responsible for the emergence of one of the club's mascots. During the preliminary match between Botafogo and Madureira, the dog Biriba, which belonged to the reserve defender Macaé, invaded the field, as if celebrating the victory of the team by 10–2. Club president Carlito Rocha fell in love with the animal, especially due to its black and white fur, and decided to adopt it as a mascot. From then on, Biriba was present in every game of the club to "bring luck" and help out on the field: When Botafogo was behind, the dog was released on the field on Carlito Rocha's orders to stop the game. Inexplicably, every time this happened Botafogo managed to reverse the score.

1950s and 1960s: Golden Age 

In the 1950s and 1960s, Botafogo lived one of its golden eras, with great stars of the Brazilian National Team in its team, such as Manga, Zagallo, Didi, Quarentinha, Amarildo, Roberto Miranda, Caju, Sebastião Leônidas, Paulo Valentim, Rogério, Gérson, and Carlos Roberto. Besides them, the greatest idols in Botafogo's history also played in this period: Nilton Santos, considered the greatest left-back of all time, and Garrincha, pointed out by some as the best football player in history.

In 1951, the Glorioso placed third in the Santiago International Tournament and won the Municipal Tournament, being invited to play in the following year's Small Club World Cup, the first edition of the tournament, played in Venezuela. Playing against Real Madrid, La Salle, and the famous Millonarios, of Argentine star Di Stéfano, Botafogo finished the dispute undefeated, but in second place, tied in points with Real Madrid, and defeated in the goal average criteria.

A year later, the club revealed Garrincha to the world: the star made his professional debut on 19 July 1953, scoring three goals in a 6–3 victory over Bonsucesso at the Maracanã. In international tournaments, the team was runner-up in the Montevideo Cup and placed fourth in the Buenos Aires Quadrangular.

In 1957, the board innovated by inviting the sports columnist and club director João Saldanha to take command of the main team; even without experience in the position, João Sem Medo ("Fearless João"), as he was known, led the black-and-white squad to win the Carioca Championship. In the final, against Fluminense, Botafogo beat the rival 6–2, with five goals by Paulinho Valentim. To this day, the result is the highest score in the history of the state finals. In the same year, Botafogo competed again in the Small Club World Cup, this time against Barcelona, Sevilla, and three-time Uruguayan champion Nacional. However, Botafogo once again finished runner-up, behind Barcelona.

The following year, the club lent its main players to the Brazilian National Team: Garrincha, Nilton Santos, Didi and Zagallo, which helped Brazil win the first world title. Even without the quartet, Botafogo won the João Teixeira de Carvalho Tournament against America. It was in this competition that the black-and-whites beat Vasco da Gama with a score of 5–0, the biggest win over the rival.

Also in 1958, the club participated for the first time in the Mexico Pentagonal Tournament, finishing as runner-up. In 1959, it was defeated by Santos in the final of the Teresa Herrera Trophy. In 1960, Glorioso once again won a championship abroad, by winning the Torneio Internacional de Colombia. In the same year, the club lost striker Paulinho Valentim, traded to Boca Juniors.

In 1961, Botafogo won the Início Cup and the Carioca Championship, after beating Flamengo 3–0 in the final round, with two goals by Amarildo. Abroad, it competed for the Orange Trophy and won the Triangular Tournament in Costa Rica.

The following year, they won three titles: They were twice champions of the Carioca Championship, again defeating Flamengo 3–0 in the final round; they won the Rio-São Paulo Tournament for the first time; and they also won the Pentagonal Tournament in Mexico. Still in 1962, Garrincha led the Brazilian National Team in the campaign for the World Cup title, in a team that included five other Botafogo players.

The year 1963 began with the final round of the Campeonato Brasileiro. Botafogo reached the final against Santos, its biggest rival at the time, but ended up defeated. In the Libertadores Cup, there was another loss to the Santos team, this time in the semi-finals. The most notable achievement of the season was the Paris International Tournament when Botafogo beat Racing Paris with a goal by Quarentinha in the 40th minute.

The revenge against the Santos team came in the Rio-São Paulo Tournament of 1964. After finishing the initial phase tied at the top, Botafogo and Santos would face each other in two extra games to decide the championship. In the first match, at the Maracanã Stadium, the team from Rio de Janeiro defeated their rivals 3–2. The return match, however, never took place, as both clubs went on tour abroad. Thus, both Botafogo and Santos were declared champions. In international territories, Glorioso won two titles: The Panamaribo Cup, in Suriname, and the Golden Jubilee Tournament, in La Paz. In the Ibero-American Tournament, in Buenos Aires, the club faced Barcelona, River Plate, and Boca Juniors. The Brazilian team and the Argentine duo finished tied on points and, without enough dates for extra games, there was no champion.

The end of 1964 marked theitsfarewell of Nilton Santos, who was retiring from football. With 721 games for Glorioso, and having never played for a team other than the Brazilian National team, the left-back played his last match for Botafogo in a 1–0 victory against Flamengo. In 1965, another departure: Haunted by a lot of pain in his right knee, Garrincha could no longer play his best football. The year before, the number 7 had decided to have surgery on his meniscus to try to solve the problem. However, the player chose to have the operation done by America's doctor, which caused dissatisfaction among the black-and-white team's managers. The relationship between club and idol was no longer the same, and in September 1965, Garrincha played his last match for Botafogo, in a 2–1 victory against Portuguesa-RJ.

Even with the departure of its greatest idols, Botafogo continued its winning trajectory: With two victories over Santos, it won the Círculo de Periódicos Esportivos Cup in 1966. In the same year, it also won the Carranza Cup in Buenos Aires. At the end of the decade, the team won the Caracas Triangular Trophy three times, in 1967, 1968, and 1970, as well as the Mexico Hexagonal Tournament in 1968.

In 1967 and 1968, coached by Zagallo, the black-and-whites were twice champions of the Guanabara Cup and the Carioca Championship, with historic victories over America, Bangu, Vasco da Gama, and Flamengo. In 1969, Botafogo was the champion of the 1968 Brazil Cup. More than 30 years later, the Brazilian Football Confederation recognized the tournament as an edition of the Brazilian Championship, and the achievement became considered the club's first Brazilian title.

1970s and 1980s: 21 years of drama 
For 21 years, Botafogo did not win any official title. From the Brazil Cup of 1968 until the Carioca Championship of 1989, the club collected runner-up finishes, third and fourth positions.

The final stretch of the 1971 Carioca Championship was negatively marked. Botafogo had four players who had won the World Cup the previous year (Carlos Alberto Torres, Brito, Paulo César Caju, and Jairzinho), and dominated the competition, with a clear lead over second-placed Fluminense. However, the black-and-whites stumbled in the last rounds and were unable to secure the title beforehand. In the last match, against Fluminense, Botafogo needed at least a draw. At 43 minutes of the second half, Fluminense scored the winning goal in a controversial move involving Fluminense's fullback Marco Antônio and Botafogo's goalkeeper Ubirajara, who claimed to have been pushed. On the rebound, Lula scored the title goal, ending Botafogo's chances. In the Brazilian Championship, the team reached the semi-finals with São Paulo and Atlético Mineiro, but lost both matches and placed third.

The following year, once again, the title escaped Botafogo. They reached the final of the Brazilian Championship after eliminating Corinthians in the semi-final. In the final against Palmeiras, a 0–0 draw gave the title to the São Paulo team, which had scored more points during the competition. The 1972 Brazilian Championship was also a highlight for the black-and-whites as they beat their biggest rival Flamengo with a score of 6–0, on the day of the latter's birthday.

In 1973, Botafogo returned to play in the Libertadores Cup after ten years. In the first round, the black-and-whites led their group, made up of Uruguayan and Brazilian teams. However, as they had tied with Palmeiras in the number of points, the regulations required an extra match to define the qualifier. At Maracanã, Botafogo won 2–1 and advanced in the competition. In the semi-final round, they were eliminated in a triangular match alongside Cerro Porteño and Colo Colo, the eventual runner-up. Two years later, Glorioso won the Augusto Pereira da Mota Cup, equivalent to the second round of the Carioca Championship. In the state championship final, however, they were once again runners-up against Fluminense. The following season, they won the second round of the Carioca Championship, this time called the José Wânder Rodrigues Mendes Cup.

In 1976, involved in a serious financial crisis, Botafogo sold its headquarters in General Severiano to Vale do Rio Doce; this fact highlighted the chaotic situation of the club and generated anger among many supporters and managers, such as former president Carlito Rocha. Former defender Nilton Santos stated that "they were killing Botafogo's glories" and that "his Botafogo no longer existed." Before transferring the football department to the Marechal Hermes neighborhood, Glorioso was left with no field to train, since the new stadium was to be inaugurated in 1978.

At this time, Botafogo ended up being nicknamed "Time do Camburão" ("Paddy Wagon Team") because it stopped having great stars in its team and began having more seasoned and problematic players who, even with some talent, could not stay long in the team. However, it was during this period that the club set two Brazilian football records: The largest number of unbeaten games in national football (52 games) and the longest unbeaten streak in Brazilian Championship matches (42 games). Despite these achievements, the club finished the Championship in 5th position in 1977 and 9th place in the 1978 edition. In 1979, Botafogo played only seven games and finished in 53rd position, its worst rank in the history of the competition.

In 1981, the club once again had a good campaign. With players such as Paulo Sérgio, Mendonça, and Marcelo Oliveira in the team, Botafogo reached the semi-final of the Brazilian Championship, against São Paulo. In the first match, at the Maracanã stadium, the team won 1–0. In the return match, at the Morumbi, there was much confusion: Botafogo's managers and players accused the São Paulo team of coercing the referee at half-time, when the black-and-whites were leading 2–1. The game took 35 minutes to restart and, in the return, São Paulo managed to turn the score, eliminating the Rio de Janeiro club. In addition, the match was marked by several controversial moves and a penalty poorly scored by referee Bráulio Zannoto in favor of the hosts.

In the 1986 Brazilian Championship, more confusion: The regulations provided for a reduction in the number of clubs from 48 to 28 teams the following year. Since Botafogo finished the competition in 31st place, they should not have qualified for the 1987 Brazilian Championship. However, a legal imbroglio involving Vasco da Gama, Joinville, and Portuguesa caused the Brazilian Football Confederation (CBF) to change the regulations of the 1986 Championship during the competition, allowing more teams to advance to the second round. The case caused a crisis in Brazilian football and opened the way for the creation of the Clube dos 13 ("Club of the 13"). Since CBF had already declared it could not afford to organize the 1987 Brazilian Championship, the newly created Clube dos 13 promoted the União Cup, with the participation of the founding clubs (among them Botafogo) and three other invited teams: Coritiba, Santa Cruz, and Goiás. Later, with the commercial success of the new competition, CBF went back and created its own Brazilian Championship, with the clubs "excluded" by the União Cup.

In the year of 1988, Botafogo remained in the Brazilian Championship, along with all the teams in the União Cup. The black-and-whites finished that year's edition in 17th place, eliminated in the first round. The most striking moment of that campaign was the 3–0 defeat to Vasco da Gama: At the end of the match, Botafogo's ball girl Sonja Martinelli, 11 years old, fell into tears and declared her love for the club. Botafogo had been 20 years without winning an official title.

From winning the Brazil Cup in 1968 until 1989, Botafogo's best results had been summer tournaments won abroad, such as the Triangular Trophy in Caracas and the City Trophy in Palma de Mallorca. The title drought was coming to an end: on 21 June 1989, Botafogo, led by Mauro Galvão, Paulinho Criciúma, and Josimar, won the Carioca Championship, undefeated, after beating Flamengo of Zico, Bebeto, and Leonardo. The first match of the decision ended in a 0–0 draw. In the second game, Botafogo won with a controversial goal by striker Maurício, number 7, after a cross from Mazolinha.

1990s: More titles and the "Tuliomania" 

The year after one of the most important titles in its history, the black-and-whites repeated their triumph in the State Championship. This time, in a controversial final against Vasco, with names such as Valdeir, Carlos Alberto Dias, Carlos Alberto Santos, and Djair in the team.

In 1992, the club returned to play a Brazilian Championship final match after twenty years, against rival Flamengo. On the eve of the first duel, a controversy erupted: The team's star player at the time, Renato Gaúcho, made a bet with the Flamengo center forward Gaúcho that, if Botafogo lost, he would make a barbecue for the opponents. With the 3–0 loss, Renato paid the bet and displeased president Emil Pinheiro and the black-and-whites fans, causing his dismissal from the second match. In the return match, without Renato, Botafogo went behind, but managed to draw 2–2. The match was also marked by the biggest tragedy in the history of the Maracanã: About 30 minutes before the ball was to start rolling, the guardrail on the upper tier, where the Flamengo fans were located, gave way and several people fell, also hitting those in the lower tier. In all, 3 people died and 90 were injured. After the event, the stadium was closed for seven months. 

With second place in the Brazilian Championship, Botafogo qualified for the 1993 CONMEBOL Cup. With no first-choice players from the good, campaign of the previous season and not enough money to buy balls for training, the Glorioso team still won the first official international title in its history. Coached by Carlos Alberto Torres, with a weak team, striker Sinval and goalkeeper Willian Bacana as the standouts, Botafogo beat Bragantino, Caracas, from Venezuela, and favorites Atlético Mineiro, before reaching the final match against Peñarol, from Uruguay. In the first meeting in Montevideo, the match was a 1–1 draw. The result encouraged the Botafogo fans, who crowded outside the Maracanã Stadium on the day of the second leg in search of tickets. Without tickets for everyone, the solution was to open the gates of the stadium. It is estimated that the public exceeded 40 thousand people, although only 26,276 paid for the tickets. On the field, the 2–2 draw took the decision to a penalty shootout. With two saves by Willian Bacana, Botafogo won 3–1 and secured the trophy. Parallel to the victorious campaign in the South American tournament, the team had a poor Brazilian Championship, finishing in 31st place.

The following year, the club was invited by CONMEBOL to compete in the South American Recopa against São Paulo, champions of the Libertadores Cup and Libertadores Supercup. In a single match, played in Kōbe, Japan, the black-and-whites were defeated 3–1, finishing as runners-up. The year 1994 was also marked by the club's return to the General Severiano headquarters, after regaining possession of the property two years earlier. In the Brazilian Championship, the team placed 5th, eliminated in the quarterfinals by Atlético Mineiro. With nineteen goals, Túlio Maravilha was the top scorer of the competition, alongside Amoroso of Guarani. 

In 1995, Túlio continued to rise. In the Carioca Championship, he was again the top scorer with 27 goals, and called himself the "King of Rio" ("Rei do Rio"), competing with strikers Renato Gaúcho, from Fluminense; Romário, from Flamengo; and Valdir Bigode, from Vasco da Gama. Despite the goals, the black-and-whites finished third in the tournament. The great glory of the year would come with the Brazilian Championship title, the club's first since the competition was organized by CBF. Besides Tulio, the black-and-whites squad included names such as Gonçalves, Donizete, Sérgio Manoel, Wilson Gottardo, and Wágner, led by then-new coach Paulo Autuori. Despite late salaries and disunity among the players, the team had a good campaign and reached the final against Santos, after eliminating Cruzeiro in the semi-final.

In the first match of the final, Glorioso won 2–1, at Maracanã. The goal difference could have been greater if referee Sidrack Marinho dos Santos had not disallowed a legal goal by Túlio. Even with the victory, the team and fans were apprehensive, as Santos had reversed a much larger advantage in the semi-final against Fluminense when they lost 4–1 in Rio de Janeiro and won 5–2 at home. In the return match, in Pacaembu, there were many controversies: Referee Márcio Rezende de Freitas made three decisive errors during the match, two in favor of Botafogo and one in favor of Santos. At the end of the duel, a 1–1 draw secured the trophy for the Rio de Janeiro team and the presence of Túlio Maravilha in the gallery of the club's greatest idols. This time, the striker was the lone top scorer of the championship, with 23 goals.

In the following season, the club disposed of most of its players, but still won titles: The main ones were the Cidade Maravilhosa Cup and the Teresa Herrera Trophy, against Juventus, champions of the Champions League. Botafogo also won the Nippon Ham Cup, in Osaka, Japan, and the Russian President's Tournament, in the city of Vladikavkaz. In the Libertadores Cup, it was eliminated in the round of 16 by Grêmio. In the Brazilian Championship, it finished in 17th place.

In 1997, Botafogo won another Carioca Championship, once again against Vasco da Gama, thanks to a goal by backup Dimba. In 1998, with the base of the previous year's Carioca championship team, the club won the Rio-São Paulo Tournament for the fourth time, beating São Paulo. In the first match at the Morumbi, with two turnovers, Botafogo won 3–2. In the return match, at the Maracanã, a draw secured the black-and-whites title.

In 1999, coached by Bebeto and Rodrigo, Botafogo were runners-up in the Brazil Cup after losing the final to Juventude. The return match was marked by an attendance of 101,581 fans at Maracanã, the last time the stadium hosted over 100,000 people. The duel also records the largest attendance in the history of the Brazil Cup.

At the turn of the century, Botafogo was elected by FIFA as one of the greatest clubs of the 20th century, in a list with only two other Brazilian clubs, rivals Santos and Flamengo.

The 2000s: Era of crisis 
Since the early 2000s, Botafogo had been on the merge of relegation in the Brazilian Championship. Poor campaigns were held in 1999 – when the club escaped thanks to points won in Superior Court of Sport Justice due to the Sandro Hiroshi case – in 2000 and 2001. Relegation eventually happened in 2002. Weak teams, late salaries, poor administrative management, low attendance at stadiums, and the beginning of repressive movements of organized fans were hallmarks of this dramatic period in the Glorioso's history.

Before the 2002 Brazilian Championship, Botafogo suffered with the departure of several players before the beginning of the competition. The team that in other years was led by Rodrigo and Dodô, among others, had as highlights defender Sandro and midfielder Galeano. Coached for most of the championship by Ivo Wortmann, the team failed to consolidate itself and, already under the command of Carlos Alberto Torres, who took over in the last matches of the competition, it was relegated after losing to São Paulo 1–0, with a goal by Dill.

At the end of that year, the presidential term of Mauro Ney Palmeiro ended, and he was replaced by Bebeto de Freitas, a former athlete and volleyball coach. With debts with players and businessmen, no place to train, no sponsors, and no stadium that could support its fans, in addition to players asking not to play for the club anymore, Botafogo was going through its biggest crisis ever. The 2003 Carioca Championship was used as a test, but the team did not qualify for the semi-finals.

In the B Series, Botafogo started its trajectory by losing to Vila Nova, in Goiânia, by 2–1. The first victory would only come in the third round, away from home, against CRB, by 3–0. During the competition, the club came to lead the championship but finished second place in the first phase. In the second phase, it was again in second place in its group, behind Marília. In the final quadrangular against Palmeiras, Marília, and Sport, Glorioso gained access to the A Series with a round in advance, after defeating Marília by 3–1, at Caio Martins. At the end of the competition, the team led by players like Sandro, Túlio Guerreiro, Valdo, and Leandrão finished as runners-up.

In 2004, the club's centennial year, the team again had poor campaigns, being eliminated early in the Carioca Championship and the Brazil Cup. In the main Series of the Brazilian Championship, they escaped a second relegation in the last round, by drawing 1–1 with Athletico Paranaense, in Curitiba. 

Starting in 2005, Botafogo began a process of administrative stabilization that was gradually reflected in the field. In 2006, led by former player Carlos Roberto and with players such as Dodô, Lúcio Flávio, Zé Roberto, and Scheidt, the team ended a period of eight years without titles, winning its first titles in the 21st century: It won the Guanabara Cup against America and, later, the Carioca Championship, against Madureira. Still, in 2006, Cuca would take over as coach. His work would bear good fruit the following year, when, playing modern football, the team guided by Dodô, Zé Roberto, Lúcio Flávio, Jorge Henrique, and Túlio Guerreiro, would draw attention, being nicknamed "Carrossel Alvinegro" ("Black and white Carousel"). 

Despite playing good football, 2007 was marked by a lack of titles and traumatic defeats. In the Carioca Championship, the black-and-whites won the Rio Cup against Cabofriense, but were state runners-up after two 2–2 draws against Flamengo and a defeat on penalties. In the second leg of the championship, the assistant referee Hilton Moutinho Rodrigues marked offside in a legal move of striker Dodô, in the 44th minute of the 2nd half, which angered players and management, since the striker was also expelled by referee Djalma Beltrami. In the Brazil Cup, another destabilizing defeat: The team was eliminated in the semifinals by Figueirense, in a match that had two goals disallowed by assistant referee Ana Paula Oliveira, who was removed from the sport.

In the Brazilian Championship, Botafogo began the campaign well and led the tournament for 11 rounds, finishing the first half in second place. However, internal problems generated a major drop in performance that caused the team to fall down the table, ending the year in 9th place. Also in 2007, in the Sudamericana Cup, the team fell in the round of 16 to River Plate after conceding a goal in the 47th, despite having a difference of two players. Without titles on the pitch, the milestone of the year for Botafogo was the winning of the Nilton Santos Olympic Stadium, at the time called João Havelange Olympic Stadium. The concessionaire Companhia Botafogo leased the arena, built for the 2007 Pan American Games, until the year 2027.

In 2008, Botafogo won the Peregrino Cup, which was played by teams from Rio de Janeiro and Norway, in the middle of the pre-season. However, in official tournaments, the black-and-whites achieved similar results to the previous year. It won the Rio Cup against Fluminense, but was runner-up again against Flamengo. In the Brazil Cup, Botafogo was eliminated for the second time in a row in the semi-finals, this time being defeated by Corinthians on penalties. In the 2008 Sudamericana Cup, the Glorioso fell to another Argentine team, Estudiantes de La Plata, this time in the quarterfinals. In the Brazilian Championship, it finished in 7th place.

In 2009, Mauricio Assumpção was elected president of the club and immediately found serious budgetary restrictions to reformulate the team. But even though the team was discredited, it won the Guanabara Cup. In the Rio Cup, the team reached the final, but missed the chance to win the Carioca Championship by losing to Flamengo due to an own goal by defender Emerson. During the first game of the state final, Botafogo struggled when it saw midfielder Maicosuel, the team's best player, and striker Reinaldo injured in the same move and replaced while winning the match. The team eventually succumbed for the third time in the final to Flamengo, after two 2–2 draws, again on penalties.

In the Brazil Cup, the team did poorly and was eliminated in the second round to Americano, on penalties. In the Brazlian Championship, the poor start cost the job of coach Ney Franco, who was replaced by Estevam Soares. The campaign continued to be poor and the team frequented the relegation zone for several rounds but managed to secure itself in the 2010 A Series thanks to a victory over title contenders Palmeiras in the last round.

The 2010s: A Decade of Ups and Downs 
In 2010, the club brought in the Uruguayan Loco Abreu, who received the number 13 jersey from Zagallo, which excited the fans. In the Carioca Championship, however, the team suffered a 6–0 defeat against Vasco da Gama in the third round of the Guanabara Cup, which cost Estevam Soares his job, who got replaced by Joel Santana. Joel had already coached the team in 1997 and 2000, winning the state championship in his first stint. When he arrived at Botafogo, he worked on the players' self-esteem, and the team gradually improved its results. A goal by young Caio, who would become known as the "talisman", against Flamengo, put the team in the final of the Guanabara Cup. The title was secured after a victory against Vasco, 2–0. In the Rio Cup, Botafogo faced Fluminense in the semi-finals and beat the latter 3–2. In the final against Flamengo, with panenka penalty goals by Herrera and Abreu, and Jefferson saving a penalty shot by Adriano, the black-and-whites won 2–1 and secured the state title in advance. 

In the Brazil Cup, the team did not go far: They were eliminated by Santa Cruz in the second round. In the Brazilian Championship, Botafogo was in the relegation zone, but improved its performance and climbed up the table, even fighting for a spot in the Libertadores Cup. The classification, however, did not come after a defeat to Grêmio in the last round. Even so, the club had some achievements: Jefferson was called to play for the Brazilian National team, being the first player from the club to reach the national team in 12 years, after Gonçalves and Bebeto. Before that, Loco Abreu played in the 2010 World Cup for Uruguay, becoming the first black-and-whites player in World Cups after 12 years.

In 2011, Botafogo had a bad start to the season, which led to Joel's dismissal and the hiring of Caio Júnior. Still, the change was not enough to save the first semester, which ended with the team being eliminated early in both the Carioca Championship and the Brazil Cup. However, in the Brazilian Championship, Botafogo had an outstanding campaign and again fought for a spot in the Libertadores Cup. Prioritizing the national title, they used backup players in the Sudamericana Cup and were eliminated in the round of 16 by Santa Fe of Colombia. In the final stretch of the Brazilian Championship, the team suffered seven losses in nine games and finished the competition in 9th place. Coach Caio Júnior was fired after the setback against América Mineiro, and was replaced by Flávio Tênius in the last three matches. Because of the disappointing campaign, the club's management dismissed several players. 

In 2012, Botafogo hired Oswaldo de Oliveira as the coach. The only major team in Rio outside the Libertadores, the team dedicated itself to the Carioca Championship and was the only team to finish both the Guanabara and Rio cups undefeated. In the finals against Fluminense, however, the Glorioso was defeated 4–1, ending their title chances. In the same week, Botafogo not only lost its unbeaten streak but also the chance of competing for the first semester titles: A 2–1 loss to Vitória, in the Engenhão, in the round of 16 of the Brazil Cup and another loss to Fluminense in the second leg of the Carioca final, confirming the runner-up spot.

In the Brazilian championship, the club made its biggest signing in recent years and the biggest in Brazilian football this season, bringing in Dutch star Seedorf. The player was officially presented on 7 July, before the team's 8th round match against Bahia, at Engenhão which ended a 3–0 win. However, in the Dutchman's debut, the team suffered a 1–0 loss to Grêmio. Seedorf's first goal would come two weeks later, in Goiânia, against Atlético Goianiense, from a free-kick. In the Copa Sudamericana, the team disappointed again and was eliminated in the first round to Palmeiras. In the Brazilian champsionship, the black-and-whites finished in 7th position.

In 2013, however, Seedorf led the team in the Carioca Championship, which Botafogo won along with the Guanabara and Rio cups, against Vasco and Fluminense, respectively. The Brazilian championship also started well for the black-and-whites, who led the competition for six rounds. However, with the sales of Fellype Gabriel and the revelation Vitinho, in addition to the problems with salary delays, the team faced some instability; it was eliminated by Flamengo in the quarterfinals of the Brazil Cup, defeated 4–0. Even with the irregularity in the final half of the season, the team managed to finish the Brazilian championship in 4th place, securing a spot in the 2014 Libertadores Cup after an 18-year absence in the continental competition.

In the first half of 2014, using backup players for almost the entire competition, Botafogo had its worst campaign in the history of the Carioca Championship, with four wins, five draws, and six losses, a 37.8% record and negative goal difference, finishing 9th among 16 participants. In the Libertadores Cup, despite the unrestricted support of the fans, who filled the Maracanã stadium for the team's four matches, Botafogo was eliminated in the group stage. In the Brazil Cup, the team entered the round of 16 and eliminated Ceará in a historic game: A 4–3 come-from-behind win at the Castelão, with goals in the 49th and 50th minutes of the second half. But in the next round, the black-and-whites were once again a disappointment and were eliminated by Santos, 5–0 in Pacaembu. In the Brazilian Championship, with a weak team and delayed salaries, the club had one of the worst campaigns in its history and was relegated for the second time to the B Series, after another defeat to Santos, 2–0, in the 37th round.

In 2015, Botafogo won the Guanabara Cup, but finished runner-up in the state championship after losing the final to Vasco. In the Brazil Cup, they were eliminated by Figueirense at home. The result, coupled with an inconsistent performance in the B Series, culminated in the dismissal of coach René Simões. Ricardo Gomes was hired in his place and, even though challenged and with a weak team, won the title of the competition and secured a return to the main series ahead of schedule. In 2016, the black-and-whites were again runners-up in the Carioca Championship after losing to Vasco in the final. In the Brazil Cup, Botafogo was eliminated in the round of 16 by Cruzeiro, beaten 5–2 in the first leg, and defeated 1–0 in the return one. In the Brazilian Championship, the club started very poorly, finishing the first half of the season in the relegation zone. In the second half of the competition, after Ricardo Gomes left for São Paulo and Jair Ventura took over as coach, Glorioso recovered and finished the championship in 5th place, securing a spot in the Libertadores Cup. 

In early 2017, Botafogo's focus turned to the preliminary round of the Libertadores Cup. The black-and-whites entered the competition in the second round, facing Colo-Colo right from the start and eliminating the Chilean rival after a win and a draw. In the third and final preliminary round, the opponent was Olimpia. Again, the team from Rio de Janeiro managed to advance, this time on penalties after goalkeeper Gatito Fernández, who entered during the return leg, saved three penalties from the Paraguayans. Because of the first matches in the continental competition, the club used backup players in the Guanabara Cup and failed to advance from the group stage. In the Rio Cup, meanwhile, the team finished runner-up after losing the final to Vasco. In the overall semi-final of the state championship, the team's main rival was Flamengo. Also in the first half of the year, Glorioso secured qualification for the final round of the Libertadores by finishing first in their group, ahead of Barcelona de Guayaquil, Estudiantes, and defending champion Atlético Nacional.

In the second semester, Botafogo debuted directly in the round of 16 of the Brazil Cup and eliminated Sport and Atlético Mineiro, but ended up defeated in the semi-final by Flamengo. In the round of 16 of the Libertadores, the club defeated Nacional with two wins, but was no match for Grêmio, which would become the champion of this edition, and left the competition in the quarterfinals. Despite the elimination, Botafogo went down in Libertadores history as the club that eliminated the most champions of the tournament in a single edition – five in total, surpassing the record of Once Caldas which dispatched four champions in the 2004 Libertadores. In the Brazilian Championship, however, the balance was negative: After an uneven start, the team established itself and spent 14 rounds in the qualifying zone for next year's Libertadores, but lost the spot in the last round after finishing in 10th place.

Just like the end of the previous season, the year 2018 began in crisis: As it had done with Jair Ventura, who moved to Santos, the board hired the inexperienced Felipe Conceição, until then an assistant, as a coach. But this time the bet did not work out and Botafogo suffered two eliminations early in the season, which culminated in the coach's dismissal: They lost in the semifinal of the Guanabara Cup to Flamengo and were eliminated in the first round of the Brazil Cup to Aparecidense, a team from the D Series of the Brazilian Championship. Directed by Alberto Valentim, the team rose in performance and reached the high point in the final round of the Carioca Championship: They overcame Flamengo, main rivals of the Guanabara Cup, 1–0 in the overall semi-final and advanced to face Vasco in the grand final. In the first match of the final, the 3–2 defeat, coming from behind and conceding a goal in the last minute at the Nilton Santos Stadium, gave Vasco the advantage of a draw in the next match. In the return match, however, Botafogo, in front of almost 65,000 people at the Maracanã, had Argentinean defender Joel Carli score the goal of the victory by 1–0 in the 50th minute of the 2nd half. In the penalty shootout, once again the highlight was Gatito Fernández, who defended two penalties and secured Glorioso its 21st state title

In the middle of the year, Valentim accepted an offer in Egypt and left the club, being replaced by the experienced but little-known Marcos Paquetá. The new commander lasted only five games, accumulating four losses and one victory, being soon replaced by Zé Ricardo. Already under his fourth coach in the season, Botafogo reached the round of 16 of the Sudamericana Cup but was eliminated on penalties to Bahia. In the Brazilian Championship, the team was irregular and fought against the last positions throughout the competition, but took off in the final stretch and finished in 9th place. The year 2018 also marked the last season of the idol Jefferson: At 35 years old and with 459 matches for Botafogo, behind only Nilton Santos and Garrincha in the list of athletes whom most times wore the club's jersey, the goalkeeper retired after a 2–1 victory against Paraná, in a game of the semi-finals of the Brazilian Championship.

In 2019, Botafogo had a bad season: In the Carioca Championship, it did not qualify in any of the rounds and finished only in 8th place. In the Brazil Cup, it was eliminated in the third round to Juventude, while in the Sudamericana Cup, the main rival was Atlético Mineiro. In the Brazilian Championship, the club spent almost the entire competition in the middle of the rankings and fought against relegation in the final rounds, finishing in the 15th position, without qualifying for the Sudamericana the following year. Behind the scenes, the year was marked by protests by players, controversial statements by managers, and a significant financial crisis, controlled with the help of loans coming from "influential Botafogo supporters."

2020's 
After the previous troubled years, the 2020 season began under great expectations for the creation of the so-called "Botafogo S/A": A project with investors for the professionalization of the football department. However, the idea never got off the paper and the season turned out to be chaotic for Botafogo, exposing the size of the financial, political, and sporting crisis in the club.

In an atypical year due to the COVID-19 pandemic, in which the Brazilian football calendar was paralyzed for about three months and matches were played without attendance, black-and-whites fans celebrated from afar the signings of two internationally renowned stars: The Japanese Keisuke Honda and the Ivorian Salomon Kalou. However, the athletes never performed as well as the rest of the team, and in all, there were eight coaches throughout the season (including Argentine Ramón Díaz, who never made his debut, and three interims). The scenario was reflected in the poor results: In the Carioca Championship, only a 5th-place finish; in the Brazil Cup, an elimination in the round of 16 against Cuiabá; and in the Brazilian Championship, the team made its worst campaign regarding points – the fourth worst among all teams in the format's history – and was relegated for the third time.

In the 2021 season, Botafogo hired Marcelo Chamusca as the coach, placed 6th in the Carioca Championship, and was eliminated by ABC in the second round of the Brazil Cup. Even with the poor results, Chamusca stayed for the B Series, but the team's performance remained erratic and the coach was fired after ten rounds, being replaced by Enderson Moreira. Only under the new coach, the work of restructuring and reorganization of the club (marked by the hiring of director of football Eduardo Freeland and CEO Jorge Braga) began to bear fruit on the field. With the highlight of players like Chay and Rafael Navarro, coupled with a strong performance at home in the Nilton Santos Stadium, Botafogo imposed itself during the competition, conquered the access, and became second-time champion of the B Series of the Brazilian Championship with one round in advance, in an edition considered "the most difficult in history", which counted with major rivals such as Cruzeiro and Vasco da Gama.

Basketball

1930s and 1940s: First titles and merger 
In the 1930s, Botafogo Football Club competed in basketball competitions through the Metropolitan Basketball Association (AMB), which promoted editions of the Carioca Championship from 1933 to 1937, all won by the club. At the end of the decade, they joined the Rio de Janeiro State Basketball Federation (FBERJ), then called the Carioca Basketball League, and won the 1939 Carioca Championship. On the other hand, Club de Regatas Botafogo had already disputed the FBERJ tournament, winning the runner-up spot in 1934 and 1937. The FBERJ does not consider and does not count the AMB championships as official in its documents.

In the early 1940s, the sport was responsible for the merger of the clubs and the creation of the current Botafogo de Futebol e Regatas. During a game between the two teams, in the Carioca Championship, Armando Albano, one of the main scorers of Botafogo Football Club and the Brazilian National Team, suffered a sudden heart failure on the court. After the player was taken to the locker room, the match restarted, but soon the news of his death interrupted the confrontation, which was 23–21 to the football club. Enveloped in a deep atmosphere of commotion after the tragedy, the presidents Eduardo Góis Trindade, of football, and Augusto Frederico Schmidt, of rowing, promoted the merger of the clubs, made official on 8 December of that year.

Still, in 1942, Botafogo Football Club once again became state champion, a feat that Botafogo de Futebol e Regatas would repeat in the next three years, in 1943, 1944, and 1945. The Glorioso also won the 1947 tournament, establishing a hegemony in Rio de Janeiro.

1950s and 1960s: National pioneer 
The first edition of the Carioca Women's Basketball Championship was played in 1952 and three years later Botafogo won its first state title. The club was also runner-up in the 1956 and 1959 seasons.

In the 1950s the club only obtained conquests thanks to the women, but the 1960s had titles from both sexes. The women's team, led by Martha, won the state championship four times in 1960, 1961, 1962, and 1963; the men's team won the Carioca Championship three times from 1966 to 1968. In 1967, Botafogo went down in history as the first Rio de Janeiro club to win the national basketball championship by winning the Brazil Cup, the country's main competition at the time. The final match was played at the Club Municipal gymnasium, against Corinthians, which had been champion the previous two years. The match began with an advantage for the São Paulo club, but Botafogo recovered and dominated the action from the second half on. With a shot by Raimundo and a missed free throw by Amaury at the end of the game, apart from the 23 points of the top scorer César, the Glorioso won by 85–84 and took the trophy.

With the Brazilian title, Botafogo secured a spot in the 1967 Sudamericano Championship, in Chile. The team from General Severiano finished the tournament in third place. Soon after, the Glorioso showed interest in hosting another edition of the Sudamericano Championship, considered the official one, which was scheduled to take place the same year; however, due to a lack of competitors, the 1967 tournament did not take place. Thus, Botafogo was declared South America's representative for the 1968 FIBA Intercontinental Cup in the United States. The Rio de Janeiro club placed fourth in the World Championship, after being outplayed in both of its matches. In the semi-final, it was defeated by the North American Akron Wingfoots, and in the third-place match, it succumbed to Olimpia Milano of Italy.

1990s and 2000s: Resurgence and crisis 
After two decades of financial crisis and no victories in the sport – the best placing was runner-up in the 1973 Carioca Championship. Botafogo returned to glory in the courts in the 1990s. In 1991, they defeated Flamengo in both games of the final and became the state champion. In women's, the club took the cup in 1995, also defeating Flamengo, this time in the semi-final.

In 1999 and 2000, with a team filled with stars such as Marcelinho, Alexey, Keith Nelson, Mãozão, and Arnaldinho, the Glorioso reached the state final twice in a row, but ended up defeated by Flamengo and Vasco, respectively. In the 2001 National Championship, Botafogo eliminated Fluminense in the quarterfinals but lost to COC/Ribeirão Preto in the three-out-of-five series. Despite the good campaigns, the club ended up closing the professional department in 2002. In women's, Botafogo was the state champion in 2006.

Years 2010: Debut in the NBB and continental title 
In 2012, the black-and-whites returned to compete in an edition of the Carioca Championship, but with a practically amateur team. The return to professional basketball only happened in 2015, when the club competed in the state championship with Flamengo and Macaé. With a much lower investment compared to their rivals, Botafogo finished the competition in third place, with only one victory. In the same year that it returned to the sport in men's, the club announced the end of the professional women's team.

In the 2016 Carioca Championship, Glorioso faced Flamengo, Macaé and Vasco. Despite the signings of Americans Phillip Flowers and Wesley Russel, the team lost every game in the qualifying round. In the semi-final, it was eliminated by Flamengo after two losses. In the Super Cup Brazil, a tournament equivalent to the third division of national basketball at the time, Botafogo was eliminated by Santos-AP.

In 2017, Botafogo played for the first time in the Golden League, a competition equivalent to the second division of Brazilian basketball, which gives access to the Novo Basquete Brasil (NBB). In the qualifying round, the team finished in first place with 11 wins in 16 games. After eliminating Blumenau in the semi-final, Botafogo became champion by beating Joinville/AABJ in the final. American point guard Jamaal Smith, signed less than three weeks before the tournament debut, was named MVP of both the regular season and the playoffs. With the title, Botafogo secured its participation in the tenth edition of the NBB.

The debut in Novo Basquete Brasil took place on 16 November, at the Oscar Zelaya Gymnasium, against Pinheiros. The first victory in the history of the competition came in the next game: In a balanced game, the black-and-whites defeated Liga Sorocabana 70–64. At the end of the first phase, Botafogo advanced to the playoffs as the last-ranked team, in 12th place. After a thrilling first game, when it was defeated only in the overtime, the team was no match for its Rio Grande do Sul rival in the following confrontations and ended up eliminated from the competition, losing the series 3–0.

For the 2018–19 season, Botafogo hired coach Léo Figueiró, a former player of the club, and reinforced itself with names such as guard Coelho, small forward Arthur, and centers Ansaloni and Murilo Becker, in addition to Cauê Borges, elected the best small forward/marker in the previous edition of the NBB, when he played for Caxias do Sul. In the Carioca Championship, the black-and-whites reached the final for the first time in 18 years, after eliminating Vasco in the semi-final. However, the team lost to Flamengo in the final and finished runner-up.

In NBB 11, at the end of the first round, the team qualified for the newly created Super 8 Cup and, after defeating Pinheiros, was eliminated in the semi-finals by Flamengo in a single game. Botafogo finished the qualifying round in 6th place and faced São José in the first round of the playoffs, winning the best-out-of-three series 2–0. In the quarterfinals they faced Pinheiros in a tough duel that was decided in the fifth and final game: At the Henrique Villaboim Gymnasium, in São Paulo, Botafogo beat the rival 82–78, ending the series 3–2 and qualifying once again for a Brazilian Championship semifinal, something that had not happened since 2001. Against Flamengo, the Glorioso had good performances but left the competition defeated 3–1 in the series. Thanks to the 4th place in the NBB, Botafogo won the unprecedented spot in the Sudamericana League.

In their first international competition since returning to basketball, Glorioso began the competition with a loss against Salta Basket, from Argentina, but then recovered with two wins against Nacional, from Uruguay, and San Andrés, from Colombia. In the semi-final round, after beating Nacional again, the black-and-whites defeated Salta with difficulties. With 1.4 seconds left in the game, the team suffered a comeback, but secured the victory in the final minutes, three milliseconds from the end, with a shot by Arthur Bernardi. In the last game of the group, in a confrontation against the Ciclista Olímpico, from Argentina, Botafogo was losing by 17 points at the end of the third quarter, but managed a historic comeback in the last period and qualified for the finals of the tournament. In the first duel of the final against Corinthians, the team coached by Léo Figueiró played poorly and was defeated at home by 88–74, in a game played at the Carioca Arena 1. However, the trajectory in the Sudamericana League was marked by comebacks by Botafogo: The team tied the series in the next game, winning by 74–64, and defeated Corinthians again in the decisive game, this time by 74–70, thus winning the first international title in the history of Botafogo's basketball, with highlights to the performances of Jamaal Smith and Cauê Borges, elected the MVP of the finals.

2020s 
Even after winning the main title in the club's history, Botafogo basketball started 2020 in crisis. In February, it was reported that the players and members of the coaching staff had not been paid for three months but a sponsorship contract signed with Ambev would alleviate the accounts. In April, four months of salaries were overdue and there was no prospect of payment, a situation aggravated by the COVID-19 pandemic in Brazil, which culminated at the end of the NBB 12 season without the playoffs and without defining a champion. For the selection for continental competitions, the first-round classification served as a final placement for the teams, and Glorioso closed the season in 8th position. Because of the Sudamericana League title, Botafogo would qualify for the Champions League Americas.

Even with the funds from AMBEV (thanks to the Sports Incentive Law), the club found itself in a difficult position after TIM, the main sponsor of Botafogo basketball, redirected the funds to cultural projects due to changes in the contract. The day before the announcement, forward Cauê Borges had left the club for Paulistano. In the same week, managers Gláucio Cruz (director of Olympic sports) and Alexandre Brito (vice-president of Olympic sports) left their respective positions. This finally resulted in the announcement on 30 July 2020,of the end of the basketball project, through a post by coach Léo Figueiró on social media. With this, the club gave up its participation in the NBB and Champions League Americas.

However, in November 2020, part-owner Carlos Salomão was appointed Botafogo's basketball director and recreated the team to compete in the Brazilian Club Championship, a competition equivalent to the second division of national basketball, which gives access to the NBB. But the black-and-whites failed to return to the country's top tournament after being eliminated in the semi-finals by União Corinthians, which would become the champion.

Swimming

1890s to 1900s: The federation emerges 
Botafogo is one of the most traditional swimming clubs in Brazil. In Rio de Janeiro, the sport emerged around the 1850s, when organized competitions began to attract public interest and the regular practice of this type of exercise became synonymous with "civility". On 31 July 1897, alongside Icarahy, Gragoatá, and Flamengo, Botafogo was one of the founding clubs of the Metropolitan Swimming Federation, today called the Aquatic Federation of the State of Rio de Janeiro (FARJ).

1960s and 1970s: Golden Age 
In 1967, Botafogo was champion for the first time in the Brazil Swimming Trophy. In the same year, the club's swimmer José Sylvio Fiolo won the gold medal in the 100- and 200-meter breaststroke events and the bronze medal in the 4 x 100-meter medley relay at the Pan American Games in Winnipeg. In 1968, Fiolo broke the world record for the 100-meter breaststroke.

In the 1970s, the black-and-whites competed with rival Fluminense, the highlight of Rio de Janeiro and national swimming. Between 1971 and 1974, Botafogo became a four-time champion of the Brazilian Swimming Trophy, and from 1972 to 1975, it was also the four-time champion of the José Finkel Trophy.

Years 2000 and 2010: Statewide prominence 
At the beginning of the 21st century, Botafogo won titles at the state level in several categories and was a two-time Rioadult champion in 2005 and 2006. In 2010, it ranked 5th in the Brazilian Club Ranking and won the State Efficiency Trophy for the sixth time. The following year, Botafogo athlete Larissa Simões won the gold medal in the 200-meter breaststroke at the South American Youth Championships.

The 1910s and 1920s: The Beginning 
The first team sport to take part in the Olympic Games of the Modern Era, water polo started being practiced in Rio de Janeiro in the beginning of the 20th century, on the now extinct Santa Luzia Beach. Initially, the sport was practiced in the sea, in lakes or rivers, and soon Botafogo Cove became one of the sport's practice spots, which gained its space in several clubs in the city, among them Botafogo.

1940s to 1960s: First titles 
In 1942, Botafogo won the Carioca Championship for the first time. However, the first official title in the modality was also the last achievement of Club de Regatas Botafogo before the merger with Botafogo Football Club. Still in the 1940s, the club would be champion three more times: in 1944, 1947, and 1949. After a title-less period in the 1950s, the black-and-whites would lift the trophy again in 1963, 1965, and 1966.

1980s and 1990s: National success 
In the early 1980s, Botafogo was state champion in 1980, 1982 and 1983, a feat it would repeat in 1995 and 1996. Furthermore, this period marked the beginning of glories at the national level: The black-and-whites were twice champions of the Brazilian Championship in 1995 and 1996, at the time called the João Havelange Trophy.

The 2000s and 2010s: The Beginning of Sovereignty 
In the 21st century, the club won the Carioca Championship in 2005, 2006, 2009, and 2010. In the National League, a competition that replaced the João Havelange Trophy as the Brazilian Championship of the sport, Botafogo took the title in 2015, in addition to winning the Brazil Trophy in 2016.

In 2009, with the emergence of the Olga Pinciroli Trophy, the team began to compete in women's tournaments as well. In all, the club collects three bronze medals and a runner-up finish in the competition. In 2014, it drew attention to the sport by signing the American Brenda Villa, a four-time Olympic medalist, and three-time world champion, and voted the best player in the world in the 2000s.

In 2016, the men's team won the first edition of the South American Club League, which also yielded the National Super League title. At the Olympic Games, the Brazilian National Team included six athletes from the club, finishing the competition in 8th place. The following year, Botafogo won the South American Club Championship.

Rowing 

Based at one of the postcards of Rio de Janeiro, the Botafogo rowing club was founded in 1891 under the name Grupo de Regatas Botafogo. However, soon after, the club had to shut down its activities, returning three years later as Club de Regatas Botafogo. It is one of the main sports in the club's history, next to football. It came from there the greatest revelation of national rowing: Antônio Mendes de Oliveira, the Brazilian champion in 1902. In 1924, Antônio became president of Botafogo. Today, they count with prominent athletes such as Aílson Eráclito da Silva, Célio Dias Amorim, Armando Marx, Anderson Nocetti, Diego Nazário, Bianca Miarka, and Marciel Morais. The club's rowing is also a highlight in the Paralympics with Isaac Ribeiro, who became a three-time Brazilian champion and participated in the World Cup in Slovenia as well as the London Paralympics.

Volleyball

1930s to 1950s: Successful Start 
A national and international reference in the sport, Botafogo was a pioneer at the state level and won the first five editions of the Men's Carioca Championship, from 1938 to 1942. The team would repeat the feat in 1945, 1946, and 1950. In the Women's Carioca Championship, the black-and-whites won the title in 1939, 1940, and from 1946 to 1950.

1960s and 1970s: South American trio and four-time Brazilian champion 
After a period of twelve years without victories on the courts, the Glorioso team conquered a trophy in 1962, when it again won the Men's Carioca Championship. By the end of the 1970s, Botafogo would become the tournament's greatest champion by winning first place thirteen more times (eleven in a row), the last one in 1979. Around the same time, the club would become one of the sport's greatest powers by winning titles at the national and international levels. Led by names such as Ary Graça, Bebeto de Freitas, Carlos Arthur Nuzman, and Mario Dunlop (present in all the victories), Botafogo won the South American Championship three times, in 1971, 1972, and 1977, and was the Brazilian champion four times, winning the Brazilian Cup in 1971, 1972, and 1975; and the Brazilian Super League in 1976. In all, the club won over 30 titles between 1965 and 1978.

While Botafogo was doing well in the men's field, the women's team won only one professional title at this time. In 1964, with players such as Eunice Rondino and Marly, the club won the Women's Carioca Championship after defeating Fluminense in the final.

1980s and 1990s: Decline 

After facing their golden age in the previous decades, the black-and-whites gradually abandoned the sport. In men's, the last time the club played a national competition was in 1984, when it finished fifth in the Brazil Cup. Since then, Botafogo has participated only in state tournaments such as the Carioca Championship and the Rio Cup, without achieving any victories. In women's, the team became the state champion in 1995, led by the lifter Ana Richa. Thanks to the title, the club participated in the Brazilian Super League that season, finishing the competition in 9th place.

Years 2000 and 2010: Return to the top canceled 
Only in 2007, 28 years after the previous conquest, Botafogo would again be champion of the Men's Carioca Championship by defeating Unipli in the final. In 2013, the club returned to the national competition after a 29-year absence by participating in the Supercopa. On that occasion, the black-and-whites won the Mata Atlântica stage and finished the final phase of the competition in third place. In women's, the club reached the state runner-up title in 2008, when it lost the decision to Rexona/Ades. In 2015, the team became the champion of the Rio Cup.

In 2015, Botafogo won the Men's Rio Cup and guaranteed their participation in the 2016 Superliga B, the second division of national volleyball. However, they were eliminated in the semi-final, defeated by Castro. In 2017, they once again failed to win promotion to Superliga B, again eliminated in the semi-final, this time to SESC. In the Gold Cup, although having Olympic runner-up Marcelinho, the club wasted for the third time the chance to qualify for the main Superliga division after losing to Corinthians/Guarulhos in the last match. Already in the 2018 Superliga B, the black-and-whites started irregularly, but managed to reach the final rounds and finished the qualifying round in 3rd place. In the quarterfinals, they defeated UPIS/Brasília, but were eliminated for the third consecutive edition in the semi-final, this time to Itapetininga, postponing for the fourth time access to the main league of volleyball.

In 2019, access came: After winning all seven games in the qualifying round, Botafogo reached the playoffs as favorites. In the quarterfinals, they eliminated Vôlei Canoas with two 3–0 wins. In the semi-finals, they started losing the series to Lavras, but defeated the opponent in the next two matches and qualified for the final of Superliga B, ensuring access to the main league of volleyball after 35 years of absence. In the single game final, against Blumenau, the black-and-white team led by experienced opposite spiker Lorena became champion of Superliga B. Despite this, the club ended up closing the professional volleyball team before the start of the new season, at the end of October of the same year, claiming financial difficulties. The team's main highlight, Lorena (Fabrício Dias) did not spare criticism to the management, claiming:

References 

Football
Botafogo de Futebol e Regatas
Rio de Janeiro state football team